Giosuè is an Italian male given name, cognate to English Joshua. It may refer to:

People
 Giosuè Argenti, Italian sculptor
 Giosuè Bonomi, Italian bicycle racer
 Giosuè Carducci, Italian poet
 Giosuè Cattarossi, Italian cleric
 Giosuè Cozzarelli, Panamanian beauty queen
 Giosuè Fiorentino, Italian politician
 Giosuè Fioriti, Italian football player
 Giosuè Gallucci, Italian-American criminal
 Giosuè Sangiovanni, Italian zoologist
 Giosuè Stucchi, retired Italian football player

Other uses
 Giosuè Orefice, a character from the 1997 Italian film Life Is Beautiful

Italian masculine given names